Victorian Corn Cribs are historic agricultural buildings at St. Michael's, Talbot County, Maryland.  The two structures feature elaborate tracery along the eaves and bargeboards, and are connected by a low, rough shed.  They were moved from their original site on the north side of U.S. Route 13, about two miles east of Westover, in Somerset County, to their present Talbot County site in June 1975.

It was listed on the National Register of Historic Places in 1976.

References

External links
 , including undated photo, at Maryland Historical Trust

Buildings and structures in Talbot County, Maryland
Agricultural buildings and structures on the National Register of Historic Places in Maryland
National Register of Historic Places in Talbot County, Maryland